María Belén Carvajal Peña (born 13 September 1983) is an international football referee from Chile. She is an official at the 2019 FIFA Women's World Cup in France.

References

Living people
1983 births
Chilean football referees
FIFA Women's World Cup referees
Women association football referees
21st-century Chilean women